Solich is a surname. Notable people with the surname include:

Frank Solich (born 1944), American football coach and former player
Manuel Fleitas Solich (1900–1984), Paraguayan football player and coach

Surnames of Polish origin